Laetitia Tamko, better known by her stage name Vagabon, is a Cameroonian-American self-taught multi-instrumentalist, singer-songwriter and music producer based in New York City.

Biography

Early life 
Laetitia Tamko was born in Yaoundé, Cameroon. At age 13 her family relocated to New York so her mother could attend law school. Having come from a French-speaking country, Tamko learned to speak English and was soon able to attend Westchester
High School. Tamko later attended City College of New York and graduated from the Grove School of Engineering in 2015.

Career 
At age 17, Tamko's parents bought her a Fender acoustic guitar from Costco. She taught herself to play by watching instructional DVDs. In 2014 she started uploading her music to Bandcamp under the pseudonym Vagabon. In addition to vocals and guitar, Tamko played drums, keyboard, and synth on her 2017 album Infinite Worlds. In 2018 she was invited to open for Courtney Barnett on her North American summer tour.

Her self-titled second album (Nonesuch, 2019) is self-produced and explores new sounds. It features digital sounds and synth strings alongside her delicate acoustic guitar. Most of the songs are written and played by the artist herself. "We reserve the right to be full when we’re on our own", she sings on her song "Every Woman". Released as a single and official video which can be seen on her website, the song is a young feminist's manifesto. The album also represents a move beyond the indie-rock scene, the shift in sound a "rejection of being pigeonholed."

In 2021 Vagabon was inter alia part of the Newport Folk Festival in July.

Discography

Studio albums 
 Infinite Worlds (Father/Daughter Records, 2017)
 Vagabon (Nonesuch, 2019)

EPs 
 Persian Garden (EP) (Miscreant, 2014)
 Vagabon on Audiotree Live (Audiotree Music, 2017)

External links 
 Vagabon's Bandcamp website
 Official website
 Musician's profile Vagabon at National Public Radio

References 

Living people
American singer-songwriters
Cameroonian emigrants to the United States
City College of New York alumni
Nonesuch Records artists
1992 births
21st-century American singers
Father/Daughter Records artists
Feminist musicians